Benjamin ben Isaac of Carcassonne was a 14th-century Jewish scholar. He is known for his translation  from Latin into Hebrew of Jean de Bourgogne of Liége's work on the corruption of the air by the plague, under the title of Ezer elohi, ma'amar be 'ipush ha-avir ve-ha-dever ('Divine Help: A Treatise on the Corruption of the Air and the Plague',  or 1399).

References
 

14th-century French Jews
14th-century French writers
14th-century translators
Latin–Hebrew translators